FTI may refer to:

 FTI (Western Australia), the Film and Television Institute in Western Australia, Australia
 Fair Trials International, a British human rights organization
 Farnesyltransferase inhibitor, a class of cancer drugs
 Federation of Thai Industries
 Fellow of the Tax Institute
 First to invent
 Fitiuta Airport, in American Samoa
 Flanders Technology International Foundation
 Flight test instrumentation
 Food Terminal Incorporated, an industrial complex in the Philippines
 Foundation for Tolerance International, a Kyrgyz peace organization
 Free thyroxine index
 Frégates de taille intermédiaire, a class of frigates of the French Navy
 F.T. Island, a South Korean pop-rock band
 FTI Consulting, an American business advisory firm
 FTI railway station, in the Philippines
 Futian railway station (Guangdong), China Railway pinyin code FTI
 FTI, a Brazilian research rocket made by Fogtrein